The Hawk's Well Theatre opened in Sligo Town on 12 January 1982. Located next to Sligo's tourist office, it was the first purpose-built theatre in rural Ireland.

History
When the theatre opened on 12 January 1982, it was the first purpose-built theatre in 'rural Ireland'. The then president of Ireland, Patrick Hillery attended the opening. It was named after W.B. Yeats play At the Hawk's Well, and was a result of an initiative of the Arts Council and Bord Fáilte.

In 2002, it was the subject of an RTÉ television documentary on the "Townlands" series.

In a 2019 article in The Irish World, the theatre was described as "binding people together, bridging perceived boundaries and manifesting the spirit of enterprise which are intended to build a bright future for the local economy".

As it approached its 40 year anniversary, the 340 seats in the theatre were scheduled to be replaced in August 2020.

Alumni
By 1993, the Hawk's Well theatre had developed some of Ireland's "premier actors". Other performers, who have attained notability, include Shane Filan, Kian Egan and Mark Feehily, whose performances in a production of the musical Grease led to an interim group IOU which played four nights at theatre before Louis Walsh was contacted and determined to form Westlife.

References

Notes

Footnotes

Sources
 
 
 
 
 
 

1982 establishments in Ireland
Theatres in the Republic of Ireland
Buildings and structures in County Sligo
Culture in County Sligo